{{DISPLAYTITLE:C12H15N}}
The molecular formula C12H15N (molar mass: 173.25 g/mol, exact mass: 173.1204 u) may refer to:

 Benzomorphan
 Bicifadine (DOV-220,075)
 Julolidine
 MPTP (1-methyl-4-phenyl-1,2,3,6-tetrahydropyridine)